Keklikdere is a village in the Genç District, Bingöl Province, Turkey. The village is populated by Kurds and had a population of 169 in 2021.

The hamlets of Ağılcık, Dumluca, Eskikeklikdere, Hayran, İpekli, Koyuncu, Onbaşı, Yamanlar and Yeşiller are attached to the village.

References 

Villages in Genç District
Kurdish settlements in Bingöl Province